Sharif Malikah, an Egyptian poet, writer, and physician, was born in 1958. He lives in the United States. He published four poetry collections in colloquial Egyptian, three short stories collections, and seven novels.

Personal life 
Sharif Maher Mikhael Malikah was born in Alexandria in Egypt on 1 June, 1958. He studies elementary school at Bab El Louk School and then move to Al-Zahir School to complete his preparatory and secondary education. After graduating from high school, he studied at Al-Qasr Al-Aini College at Cairo University and obtained a bachelor's degree in Medicine and Surgery in 1981. After graduating from university, he worked as a health inspector in Tora and was responsible for a campaign to vaccinate prisoners in the prison. After that, he worked as deputy gynecologist and obstetrician at Al Mabarah Hospital in Maadi. In 1984, Malika immigrated to the United States to complete his medical studies and specialize in treating chronic pain. Years later, he worked as a physician at Johns Hopkins University in Maryland. He obtained American citizenship in 1990 and has resided there for nearly thirty years.

Education and career 
In 2000, Malikah wrote the first poems in colloquial Egyptian, but he did not publish them, as he used to write them only for himself and recite them to his family and friends. One day, he received a call from one of his friends informing him that the Egyptian playwrights Alfred Farag wants to meet him and listen to his poems. Listening to his poems, Farah advised him to publish all of his poems. In 2003. Malika published his first poetry collection in colloquial Egyptian Arabic, under the title "Circles". He published later two poetry collections "Stories from the Book of Love" and "Name: Egyptian” respectively.

In 2006. He published his first novel "Plastic Flowers" and then a succession of short stories, novels and poems. He has so far written four collections of poetry, three short stories collections, and seven novels.

Works

Poetry collections 

 "Circles" (original title: Dwayer), 2003
 "Stories from the Love Book" (original title: Hawadet min Kitab Al Hub), 2005
 "Name: Egyptian" (original title: Al Ism: Masriya/0, 2005
 "A Cup of Coffee with Jaheen" (original title: Fijan Kahwa Maa Jaheen), 2010

Short stories collections 

 "Immigrants" (original title: Muhajreen), 2005
 "Day 8" (original title: Al Yaoum Al Thameen), 2009
 "Life's Magic" (original title: Sihr Al Hayat), 2016

Novels 

 "Plastic Flowers" (original title: Zuhur Blastic), 2006
 "Sulaiman's Ring" (original title: Khatem Sulaiman), 2008
 "The Rainbow's Dance" (original title: Raksat Kaws Kuzah), 2010
 "Angels Also Step Up to Third's Floor" (original title: Wa Al-Mal'eka Aidaan Tas'aad ila Al Tabiq Al Thalith), 2011
 "Mariam and the Men" (original title: Mariam wa al-Rijal), 2014
 "Searching for Candid" (original title: Al Bahth An Candid), 2018
 "Happiness Invitation" (original title: Dawaat Farah), 2019

See also 

 Alfred Farag

References 

1958 births
Living people
Writers from Alexandria
Cairo University alumni
Egyptian novelists
20th-century Egyptian poets
21st-century Egyptian poets